The Orth House is a historic house located at 42 Abbotsford Road in Winnetka, Illinois. Walter Burley Griffin designed the Prairie School house, which was built in 1908. Griffin was a student of Frank Lloyd Wright, and he designed the Orth House shortly after starting his own studio; the house consequently resembles Wright's work more closely than Griffin's later work does. The -story house's design features a stucco exterior with decorative stained wood, casement windows divided into geometric patterns, and an overall horizontal emphasis, all characteristic features of the Prairie School.

The house was added to the National Register of Historic Places on October 8, 1976.

References

Houses on the National Register of Historic Places in Cook County, Illinois
Prairie School architecture in Illinois
Houses completed in 1908
Winnetka, Illinois
Houses in Cook County, Illinois
1908 establishments in Illinois
Walter Burley Griffin buildings